Peter Šulek (born 21 September 1988)  is a Slovak football midfielder who currently plays for Austrian club ASV Schrems. He is left-footed.

External links
Peter Šulek at Futbalnet

Peter Šulek at ÖFB

1988 births
Living people
Slovak footballers
Slovak expatriate footballers
Association football midfielders
FK Dukla Banská Bystrica players
FK Železiarne Podbrezová players
FK Dubnica players
MŠK Žilina players
Spartak Myjava players
FC Vysočina Jihlava players
Mezőkövesdi SE footballers
GKS Katowice players
MŠK Púchov players
MFK Karviná players
Slovak Super Liga players
Czech National Football League players
Nemzeti Bajnokság I players
I liga players
People from Detva District
Sportspeople from the Banská Bystrica Region
Slovak expatriate sportspeople in the Czech Republic
Slovak expatriate sportspeople in Hungary
Slovak expatriate sportspeople in Austria
Expatriate footballers in the Czech Republic
Expatriate footballers in Hungary
Expatriate footballers in Austria